The Feminist Party is a Finnish feminist political party. It was founded in June 2016, and registered as a political party in January 2017. The party has three chairpersons who are Katju Aro, Warda Ahmed, and Katriina Rosavaara. It calls gender equality, human rights, and human security the primary pillars of its politics.

The party had 40 candidates in nine municipalities in the 2017 Finnish municipal elections. Katju Aro, one of the party's chairpersons, was elected to the City Council of Helsinki. The party lost its representation in municipal councils after the 2021 municipal election.

Elections results

Municipal elections

Parliament of Finland

European Parliament

See also 
 Feminist Initiative (Sweden)
 Feminist Initiative (Norway)

References

External links 
 

Feminism in Finland
Registered political parties in Finland
Feminist parties in Europe
Political parties established in 2016
2016 establishments in Finland